Legislative elections were held in El Salvador on 12 March 2006. Although the Farabundo Martí National Liberation Front received the most votes, the Nationalist Republican Alliance emerged as the largest party, winning 34 of the 84 seats.

Results

References

Legislative elections in El Salvador
El Salvador
2006 in El Salvador